Kuhesangi Metro Station is a station of Mashhad Metro Line 2. The station started its operation on 10 December 2019.

References

Mashhad Metro stations
Railway stations opened in 2018
2018 establishments in Iran